The position of the vice-president of the Republic of Fiji was created in 1990, to provide a constitutional successor to the president of Fiji, in the event of the latter's death or resignation, or of his otherwise being unable to carry out his duties. The vice-president's role in government was mostly ceremonial as its sole purpose was to replace the president in his absence, death, or inability to hold office. The vice-presidency was abolished in 2013.

History of the office
Under the terms the 1990 Constitution of Fiji, the vice-presidency was divided between two persons, styled First Vice-President and Second Vice-President, respectively, but a single person has held the office of vice-president from 1999, when the 1997 Constitution of Fiji came into effect.

Under the terms of the 1997 Constitution, the vice-president was appointed by the Great Council of Chiefs, after consultation with the prime minister. In April 2009, however, the Constitution was suspended, following the earlier suspension of the Great Council of Chiefs in April 2007. Six days after the suspension of the Constitution, the government issued a decree stating that the vice-president would henceforth be appointed by the president. Ratu Epeli Nailatikau was appointed vice-president the following day.

Under the terms of the 2013 Constitution, the vice-presidency was abolished, with its duties and powers transferred to the chief justice.

Being appointees of the all-indigenous Great Council of Chiefs, Fiji's vice-presidents, like its presidents, have all been indigenous Fijians (of chiefly rank). In 2007, Reverend Akuila Yabaki, Director of the Citizens Constitutional Forum, suggested that "the time may be right now to allow a person from any race to take up this position".

Vice-presidents

Vice-presidents (single office)

|- style="text-align:center;"
| colspan=8| Vacant (29 May 2000 – 25 March 2001)

|- style="text-align:center;"
| colspan=8| Vacant (5 December 2006 – 17 April 2009)

|- style="text-align:center;"
| colspan=8| Vacant (30 July 2009 – 6 September 2013)
|- style="text-align:center;"
| colspan=8| Abolished (6 September 2013 – present)

References

Fiji, Vice President of
Politics of Fiji
Government of Fiji
Fiji
Vice-President